Mahamed Zakariiev is a Russian and Ukrainian freestyle wrestler. He won one of the bronze medals in the men's 97 kg event at the 2021 World Wrestling Championships held in Oslo, Norway.

He competed in the 97kg event at the 2022 World Wrestling Championships held in Belgrade, Serbia.

References

External links 
 

Living people
1997 births
Sportspeople from Chechnya
Ukrainian male sport wrestlers
World Wrestling Championships medalists
21st-century Ukrainian people